Twin Barrels Burning is the twelfth studio album by British rock band Wishbone Ash. It was recorded at Sol Studios and released in 1982. It was the highest charting Wishbone Ash album since 1976, reaching No. 22 in the UK Albums Chart. Conversely, it was the final album to appear in that listing to date.

It is the only Wishbone Ash album to feature Uriah Heep bassist Trevor Bolder, who was a member of the band for three years (1981–83).

Track listing

Personnel

Wishbone Ash
Andy Powell – guitar, vocals
Laurie Wisefield – guitar, vocals
Trevor Bolder – bass, vocals
Steve Upton – drums

Additional personnel
Allan Townsend – synthesizer on "Hold On"

Production
Ashley Howe, Stuart Epps – producers, engineers
Nigel Gray – producer and engineer on track 4
John Sherry – executive producer
Ian Harris – sleeve design and art

Charts

References

Wishbone Ash albums
1982 albums
albums produced by Nigel Gray